The Journal of Human Resources is a bimonthly peer-reviewed academic journal covering empirical microeconomics. It was established in 1965 and is published by The University of Wisconsin Press. The editor-in-chief is Anna Aizer (Brown University). According to the Journal Citation Reports, the journal has a 2021 impact factor of 5.784, ranking it 42 out of 379 journals in the category ‘Economics’.

References

External links

Economics journals
Quarterly journals
Publications established in 1965
English-language journals
University of Wisconsin Press academic journals